Michel Miguel da Silva (born 8 June 1981 in São Paulo), known as Michel Guerreiro or simply Michel, is a Brazilian football manager and former player who played as a defensive midfielder.

References

1981 births
Living people
Brazilian footballers
Campeonato Brasileiro Série A players
Campeonato Brasileiro Série B players
Campeonato Brasileiro Série C players
Associação Desportiva Confiança players
Sport Club do Recife players
Ceará Sporting Club players
Esporte Clube Vitória players
Clube do Remo players
Associação Esportiva Tiradentes players
Guarany Sporting Club players
Salgueiro Atlético Clube players
Association football midfielders
Brazilian football managers
Footballers from São Paulo